Jessie is a 2016 Indian Kannada romantic horror film written and directed by Pawan Wadeyar and produced by Kanakapura Srinivas & Srikanth. Reported to be a triangular love story, the film stars Dhananjay, Parul Yadav and Raghu Mukherjee in the lead roles. The music is composed by Anoop Seelin and cinematography is by Arul K. Somasundaram.

Filming began in the July month of 2015 while the first look of the film was released on 29 June 2015. The film is scheduled to release on 25 March 2016.

Cast
 Dhananjay as Jessie
 Parul Yadav as Nandini
 Raghu Mukherjee as Shyam Prasad
 Sumalatha as Jessie's mother
 Ramakrishna as Nandini's father
 Sudha Belawadi as Nandini's mother
 Sadhukokila
 Chikkanna
 Avinash
 Gautami as Nandini's friend

Soundtrack

Anoop Seelin has composed the music for the film. The audio was launch on the Valentines Day of 2016 by actor Puneeth Rajkumar. Notably this was his 25th movie as music director.

References

External links
 
 Official Facebook page

2016 films
Films scored by Anoop Seelin
2016 horror films
2010s Kannada-language films
Indian romantic horror films
Films directed by Pavan Wadeyar